Jinzaburo Yonezawa (born October 26, 1977) is a Japanese mixed martial artist. He competed in the Lightweight division.

Mixed martial arts record

|-
| Loss
| align=center| 1-5-1
| Yuichi Ikari
| Decision (unanimous)
| Pancrase: 2007 Neo-Blood Tournament Eliminations
| 
| align=center| 2
| align=center| 5:00
| Tokyo, Japan
| 
|-
| Loss
| align=center| 1-4-1
| Kenji Takeshige
| Technical Submission (arm-triangle choke)
| Pancrase: Rising 1
| 
| align=center| 1
| align=center| 4:27
| Osaka, Japan
| 
|-
| Loss
| align=center| 1-3-1
| Taku Aramaki
| Submission (triangle armbar)
| GCM: Demolition 060730
| 
| align=center| 2
| align=center| 2:53
| Tokyo, Japan
| 
|-
| Win
| align=center| 1-2-1
| Atsuo Hirano
| Submission (rear-naked choke)
| Pancrase: 2006 Neo-Blood Tournament Semifinals
| 
| align=center| 2
| align=center| 4:19
| Tokyo, Japan
| 
|-
| Loss
| align=center| 0-2-1
| Takashi Ochi
| Decision (majority)
| Shooto: R.E.A.D. 11
| 
| align=center| 2
| align=center| 5:00
| Setagaya, Tokyo, Japan
| 
|-
| Loss
| align=center| 0-1-1
| Makoto Ishikawa
| Decision (unanimous)
| Shooto: R.E.A.D. 1
| 
| align=center| 2
| align=center| 5:00
| Tokyo, Japan
| 
|-
| Draw
| align=center| 0-0-1
| Chikara Miyake
| Draw
| Shooto: Shooter's Soul
| 
| align=center| 2
| align=center| 5:00
| Setagaya, Tokyo, Japan
|

See also
List of male mixed martial artists

References

1977 births
Japanese male mixed martial artists
Lightweight mixed martial artists
Living people